The Kuno River is one of the main tributaries of the Chambal River. It flows through the Kuno National Park from south to north, draining the other rivulets and Tributaries into Chambal River in Morena at MP-Rajasthan border. It is 180 km long and originates from the Shivpuri Plateau.
Passing through districts like: Guna, Shivpuri, Baran, Sheopur and Morena.

Chambal River
Rivers of Madhya Pradesh
Sheopur district
Rivers of India